Xanthochorus buxeus is a species of sea snail, a marine gastropod mollusk in the family Muricidae, the murex snails or rock snails. It is a predator.

References

Ocenebrinae
Molluscs of Chile
Gastropods described in 1833